The Inheritance (Provision for Family and Dependants) Act 1975 is an Act of the United Kingdom Parliament concerning inheritance in England and Wales. It has been amended, for example to take into account civil partnerships.

Contents
This Act makes provision for a court to vary (and extend when appropriate) the distribution of the estate of a deceased person to any spouse, former spouse, child, child of the family or dependant of that person in cases where the deceased person's will or the standard rules of intestacy fail to make reasonable financial provision. Such provision can be derived not just from monetary assets but from any others forming part of the estate or which have been disposed of in the six years prior to the death.

The Act was introduced to extend the Inheritance (Family Provision) Act 1938, following reports from the Law Commission in 1973 and 1974.

Types of claimants
There are categories under which someone can make an Inheritance Act 1975 claim by virtue of their relationship at death with a person who was domiciled in England and Wales. These categories are:

 Spouse or civil partner
 Former spouse or civil partner who has not remarried or repartnered
 Person living as cohabitant
 Child
 Someone treated as a child or being financially maintained

In each of these categories there are criteria and requirements that must be satisfied for eligibility to claim.

Repeals
This Act entirely repealed the Inheritance (Family Provision) Act 1938. Ten other Acts were partly repealed by this Act, those repeals are listed in the Schedule to the Act; further amendments to other legislation are made by section 26 of this Act.

See also
English land law
List of Acts of Parliament of the United Kingdom Parliament, 1960-1979
Intestacy

External links 
Debate in the House of Lords on the second reading
Supreme Court case law: Ilott v The Blue Cross and others

Notes

United Kingdom Acts of Parliament 1975
Inheritance